Sinișa Dragin is a Serbian-Romanian film director.

In 2002, his movie Everyday God Kisses Us On The Mouth (In Fiecare Zi Dumnezeu Ne Saruta Pe Gura) won the 'Aleksandar Sasa Petrovic' plaque at the ninth Belgrade International Festival of Auteur Films.
His latest film is a documentary one, The Forest, which won The most innovative feature film award at Visions du Reel film festival at Nyon, Switzerland and the European Documentary Network award at the Sarajevo film festival in 2014.

Sinisa Dragin graduated from The Film and Theatre Academy, Bucharest in 1991 and has worked since then as a cameraman for Reuters. Due to his immediate contact with contemporary stories, Dragin headed at first towards documentaries, filming two shorts, The Sorrow of Black Gold (1994) and Burning is the Sun over Tichilești (1995). 
In 1995 he distinguished himself also by the short feature The Rain, which won an APTR award (The Romanian Association of Television Professionals), a Prix Italia and the Directing Award in Costinești. The first feature film for television, Long journey by train, got him several screenplay awards and the main APTR award, in 1998. His second film, Everyday God Kisses Us On The Mouth, won three directing awards and the Tiger at Rotterdam International Film Festival. He went back there in 2011 with If the Seed doesn't Die, winning the Dioraphte award, decided by the public among the movies financed by Hubert Bals Fund. In recent years, he returned to documentary, directing along with Alina Mungiu Pippidi Where Europe Ends (2009), while a third action film, The Pharaoh (2004) was starring in the leading role one of the most impressive Romanian actors, Ștefan Iordache.

Awards 

 The Sorrow of Black Gold (1994, short feature, documentary)
 1994, Grand Prize in Oberhausen, Germany; 
 1994, German Ministry of Environment's award; 
 1994, Public's special mention, Leipzig, Germany; 
 1998, Grand Prize, Las Palmas, Canary Islands,
The Rain (1995, short feature, fiction)
 1996, Directing Award, Costinești,  Romania; 
 1997, Best short fiction feature; Ravenna, Italy (Prix Italia); 
 1998, APTR  award for Best Short Feature; Bucharest, Romania;
 Long Journey by Train (1997, long feature, fiction)
 1997, Grand European Award for TV Screenplay; Geneva, Switzerland; 
 1998, Best Screenplay award, Vrnjacka Banja, Yugoslavia; 
 1998, Jury's special mention, Strasbourg, France; 
 1998, Jury's special mention, Dijon, France; 
 1999, APTR Grand Award, Bucharest, Romania;
 1999, Grand award, Bar, Iugoslavia
 Every Day God Kisses Us on the Mouth (2001, long feature, fiction)
 2001, Best Director and Jury's special award (Sylver Pyramid), Cairo, Egypt; 
 2002, The Tiger Award, Rotterdam, The Netherlands; 
 2002, Best Director award - UCIN, Bucharest, Romania; 
 2002, Best Director Award, Alba, Italia 
 2002, Best Film Award, Belgrad, Iugoslavia
 If the Seed Doesn't Die (2010, long feature, fiction)
 2011, Dioraphte award, given by the public to a movie supported by Hubert Bals Fund
 The Forest
 2014, The Most Innovative Feature Film Award, Nyon, Switzerland
 2014, European Documentary Film Network Award, Sarajevo, Bosnia & Herzegovina

References

External links

Living people
Year of birth missing (living people)
Serbian film directors
Romanian film directors